Kisstory is a British digital radio station owned and operated by Bauer as part of the Kiss Network. Playing "old skool and anthems", it is a sister station to Kiss. 

As of December 2022, the station has a weekly audience of 2.2 million listeners, according to RAJAR.

History 
Kisstory is also a radio programme on Kiss that first aired and was presented by Streetboy on 28 Jan 2002. On 7 May 2013 Kisstory was expanded into a full-time station in response to positive feedback from listeners and at the expense of Q Radio. At the same time Kiss Fresh, a then brand-new station playing "non-stop new beats including Hip-Hop, R&B, EDM, House and Garage", was given its own station.

DAB availability

Initially, Kisstory was available over Freeview and online, but was unavailable via DAB radio receivers. In 2014, Bauer announced plans to roll out the Kisstory station over DAB digital radio to London and other areas.

Kisstory began DAB rollout in London on 12 December 2014 with the addition of the service (and sister station KissFresh) to the Greater London I multiplex.

The DAB service of Kisstory was rolled out to more areas of the country at the start of 2015, replacing Absolute Radio 60s in some areas (including Bauer's owned digital multiplexes in northern England) and added in new space on others; this formed part of a wider reshuffle of Bauer's digital offering, which also included the withdrawal of Kerrang! Radio from areas outside London, and the launch of Magic 105.4 FM as a national station over Digital One. Following the expanded rollout, the Kisstory station was available in areas including London, Birmingham, Cambridge, Dundee and Perth, Edinburgh, Glasgow, Humberside, Central Lancashire, Leeds, Liverpool, Kent, Northern Ireland, Nottingham, South Yorkshire, Stoke-on-Trent, Sussex, Swansea, Teesside  and Tyne and Wear.

From 29 February 2016 the Kisstory station was made available in DAB more-widely across the UK with the launch of the second national commercial DAB multiplex, Sound Digital. Some of the local-level DAB slots vacated by Kisstory were taken over by sister station Kiss Fresh, principally in those areas where Bauer operated or co-operated the local DAB ensemble.

On 11 February 2019, Kisstory migrated from SDL to the more-widely available Digital One multiplex, taking up the space vacated by Absolute Radio 90s moving in the other direction a week prior.

Norway
In February 2016, Kisstory was launched in Norway. The station (which does not have any presenters/DJs, just non-stop music) is managed by local teams and is broadcast with Kiss in DAB+  (48 kbit/s).

References

External links
 

Bauer Radio
Radio stations in London
Radio stations established in 2013
2013 establishments in England
1990s-themed radio stations
Kiss Network